List of Memory of the World Register in Brazil, Contains 10 registered works.  The Emperor's collection was the first recorded work to be included in the list in 2003, a heritage with 23 thousand photographs of Brazil and the world from the 19th century, which had been donated by D. Pedro II and integrates Thereza Christina Maria Collection.  The Brazilian National Library (BN) is one of the members of the Brazilian Committee program and, as such, participates on the coordination of the plans of action developed in Brazil.

“The world’s documentary patrimony belongs to us all, and must be completely preserved and protected by all”. UNESCO  established, in 1992, the international program Memory of the World.

List

See also
 Memory of the World Register – Latin America and the Caribbean

References

External links
 Brazil - Memory of the World Register
 
 

Brazil